Shahab-5 (meaning "Meteor-5") is Iranian long-range ballistic missile, that was rumoured to exist as early as 1998. Estimated to be based on the North Korean Taepodong-2 with a first stage based on the Soviet RD-0216. Potential range of the missile is estimated to be between 4,000 and 4,300 km with a warhead payload of 700 to 1,000 kg.

References

See also
Military of Iran
Defense industry of Iran
Equipment of the Iranian Army

Weapons of Iran
Ballistic missiles of Iran